"Chop Suey!" is the first single from Armenian-American heavy metal band System of a Down's second album Toxicity. The single was released in August 2001 and earned the band its first Grammy nomination in 2002 for Best Metal Performance. "Chop Suey!" is often seen as the band's signature song.

Overview 
In an interview, Daron Malakian explained, "The song is about how we are regarded differently depending on how we pass. Everyone deserves to die. Like, if I were now to die from drug abuse, they might say I deserved it because I abused dangerous drugs. Hence the line, 'I cry when angels deserve to die.'" The lyrics for the midsection ("Father into your hands I commend my spirit") were randomly picked out by Serj Tankian from Rick Rubin's book collection after Tankian was struggling for ideas. Although it was not revealed what book the line was taken from, it is originally from the Bible, appearing in Luke 23:46.

Song title 
The song was originally titled "Suicide" but Columbia Records forced the band to change it to avoid controversy. The song title is therefore a wordplay: "Suey" is "suicide", "chopped" in half. However, the band members claim this change was not caused by pressure from their record company; Odadjian said the band simply chose their battles carefully. Most pressings of the album include an intro to the track where lead singer Serj Tankian can faintly be heard saying "we're rolling 'Suicide while drummer John Dolmayan is counting the band in.

Music video 
The music video was the band's first collaboration with the acclaimed director Marcos Siega, and is set in the parking lot of the Oak Tree Inn motel in Los Angeles, hometown of the band. The members are performing the song on stage, surrounded by approximately 1,500 fans. Editing devices are used to create the effect of the band members "walking through" one another and teleporting on and off the stage, an effect similar to one used in the Red Hot Chili Peppers video "Around the World". One scene briefly shows Tankian eating chop suey with some fans, the only reference to the title dish in either the song or the video. The video makes use of the SnorriCam technique, in which an actor will have a camera attached to them with a harness, making it appear as though the background is moving and the actor is stationary. In the middle of the video the Flag of Armenia can be seen. The video has been viewed over one billion times on YouTube, making it the first metal music video to do so (shortly followed by "Nothing Else Matters" by Metallica).

As of 2023, the video currently has over 1.2 billion views on YouTube, making it one of the most viewed rock videos on the platform, ranked at tenth place.

Reception 
Loudwire included the song in its list of The Best Hard Rock Songs Of The 21st Century, where it was ranked at number one. Loudwire and Kerrang both named it as System of a Down's best song.

Controversy 
"Chop Suey!" is the first single of Toxicity, an album that was number one on the charts during the week of the September 11, 2001 attacks. A controversy surrounding the popular single, especially the line '"I don't think you trust in my self-righteous suicide"', at the time led to Clear Channel Radio placing the song on a list of post-9/11 inappropriate titles. Although it was never actually banned completely from the air, Clear Channel Radio stations were advised against playing any of the songs on the list.

Track listing

Commercial performance 
"Chop Suey!" was a moderate success on the charts around the world. In Australia, after hitting No. 3 on the Triple J Hottest 100 of 2001, with virtually no airplay on commercial radio, it debuted and peaked at No. 14 in February 2002. It is System of a Down's highest-charting single in Australia. In the United States, the song peaked at No. 76, making it the band's lowest peaking song on the Hot 100 due to the fact it was taken off the radio for its political lyrics. On the Modern Rock Tracks, "Chop Suey!" peaked at No. 7, becoming the band's first top ten single. In the UK Singles Chart, it debuted and peaked at No. 17.

Charts

Weekly charts

Year-end charts

Certifications

References

External links 

2001 singles
2001 songs
System of a Down songs
Songs written by Daron Malakian
Songs written by Serj Tankian
Song recordings produced by Rick Rubin
Music videos directed by Marcos Siega
American Recordings (record label) singles
Columbia Records singles
Songs about suicide